Silvestro Aldobrandini (1500–1558) was a Florentine jurisconsult and the father of Pope Clement VIII.

Silvestro Aldobrandini is depicted in a chapel named after Sixtus V in the church of Santa Maria Maggiore in Rome.

Works

References

1500 births
1558 deaths
16th-century Italian lawyers